The Estádio 11 de Novembro is a multi-use stadium in Talatona (near Luanda), Angola. Completed in 2010 ahead of the 2010 Africa Cup of Nations, it hosted nine matches during the tournament, including five Group A matches, one Group B match, one quarter final, one semi-final, and the final.

Overview
It is currently used on a regular basis by football clubs Primeiro de Agosto, Petro de Luanda and Benfica de Luanda who play in Girabola. Its capacity is 48,000.

The stadium is named after the date of Angola's independence.

The stadium is located in Talatona municipality at the Expressway surrounding Luanda on the road side.

1º de Agosto vs TP Mazembe post-match incident
Five people were reportedly killed after the 45.000 capacity crowd match on Saturday 15 September 2018, including two children who were trampled and/or suffocated to death while exiting the stadium. Before the match begun, supporters called a radio station urging the organization to open all gates after the match ended for fear of a tragedy and after going through similar ordeals in the past. The Angolan Ministry of Youth and Sports in a statement regretted the incident, expressed condolences to the relatives and vowed to launch an investigation. On their part, the club's management promised to assist the relatives in funeral expenses.

References

External links

Venue information  
Stadium information 
Photographs of the stadium

Buildings and structures in Luanda Province
Football venues in Angola
Athletics (track and field) venues in Angola
2010 Africa Cup of Nations
Sport in Luanda
2009 establishments in Angola
Sports venues completed in 2009